Jim Cashman is an American actor and writer, known for his role as "Jamie" in television and radio commercials for the Progressive Corporation beginning in 2014.

Early life and career
Cashman is from Las Vegas, Nevada, and started his comedy career at The Groundlings sketch comedy troupe and school in Los Angeles, California. He wrote material for Benched, The Looney Tunes Show, and Saturday Night Live.

In his recurring role in the commercials, Cashman plays "Jamie" a sidekick of fellow actress Stephanie Courtney in her role as Flo. He has appeared in several television series including It's Always Sunny in Philadelphia, Grey's Anatomy, and Just Shoot Me! He appeared in the film The Boss in 2016.

Personal life
Cashman has been married to Michelle Noh since November 15, 2003.

References

Living people
American male film actors
American male television actors
21st-century American male actors
Year of birth missing (living people)